Banani Railway Station is a railway station located in Banani, Dhaka District, Bangladesh. No intercity trains stop at the platformless Banani railway station except for certain number of mail express. But from now all intercity train tickets are sold in advance.

References

External link 
 
 

Railway stations in Dhaka District